is a Japanese actor and musician from Tokyo Prefecture.

References
Yuki Ito's "Greatest Spirit" - Personal Blog 

1985 births
Musicians from Tokyo
Male actors from Tokyo
Living people
Japanese male musicians
21st-century Japanese actors
21st-century Japanese musicians